John  Sinclair Lumsdaine (18 November 1895 – 28 August 1948) was an Australian singer and songwriter.

His best known songs celebrate Australian personalities Donald Bradman, Phar Lap and Sydney Harbour Bridge. He was highly sought for advertising campaigns like Cornflakes and Flour.

In the 1930s he was on the announcing staff of Sydney radio station 2GB.

Military service
Jack Lumsdaine enlisted in the Australian Imperial Forces in 1915  He suffered a gas attack in France and became known as the whispering baritone in his radio and Jazz recording career.

Works
 1923 Wodonga
 1924 Aussie Rose 
 1925 Somewhere South of Shanghai
 1927 You'll Miss Me When I'm Gone 
 1927 Canberra is Calling to you
 1928 Calling to You
 1941 Am I? 
 1942 Digger 
 1945 Sydney Flour Song
 England in the Morning
 Cobber o Mine
 We're Hanging Out Our Washing on The Siegfried Line
 1946 Curl The Mo, Uncle Joe
 Johnie our Aeroplane Girl
 Verm-X song
 Cornflakes song
 Tintex song
 Banish The Budget Blues

Memorabilia
photograph of him on some sheet music
Photograph

Recordings
 1932 I'm Waiting for Ships That Never Come In 
 1938 Queanbeyan 
 1928 Honeymoon Cottage 
 1943 Scallywag 
 1938 Canberra is Calling to You 

Sheet music from forty songs are preserved at Australian libraries. Many performed with the 2FC radio orchestra or George Trevare. Thirty-six of his recordings like You'll Miss Me When I'm Gone  are preserved at the National Film and Sound Archive.

References

1895 births
1948 deaths
Australian male singer-songwriters
20th-century Australian male singers
Composers
Jazz